Danita Paner (born 2 April 1989) is a Filipino pop-rock singer and actress. She is the daughter of former basketball player Manny Paner and actress Daisy Romualdez, and sister of Kristina Paner. She has an album produced by VIVA Records named Promotor containing 10 tracks which includes the songs "Lunod", "Kung Wala Na Nga", a cover of Prettier Than Pink's "Cool Ka Lang" and Rivermaya's "Himala". Paner made her debut teleserye appearance via TV5's My Driver Sweet Lover opposite JC de Vera. As of 2015, she has been seen on ABS-CBN.

Filmography

Television

Film

References

1989 births
Living people
Filipina gravure idols
Filipino television personalities
Actresses from Metro Manila
Singers from Metro Manila
21st-century Filipino women singers